Queen of the Universe may refer to:
Basilica of Mary, Queen of the Universe
Queen of the Universe (TV series)